Corrosion societies are professional societies for corrosion engineers for the purpose of sharing experience and discoveries.

Australasian Corrosion Association (ACA) was incorporated in 1958 as a not-for-profit primarily operating in Australasia. 

NACE International claims to be the worldwide society with universally accepted standards.

European Federation of Corrosion (EFC) is an association of individual European country Corrosion societies joined in a larger umbrella group known as the European Federation of Corrosion. They meet at an annual congress named EUROCORR.

A cooperation between EFC and NACE was signed during the NACE Corrosion conference in San Diego, California in March 2003. The agreement improved benefit sharing between the two parties like discounts on publications and journal subscriptions. NACE and EFC will also publicize each other's event's and activities.

The Institute of Corrosion (I.Corr) is a United Kingdom-based organisation and offers designator letters after a name to suitably qualified members. 

The Australasian Corrosion Association works with NACE in Australia and New Zealand offering accredited NACE courses in the Australasian region. The annual Corrosion & Prevention conference held in November each year presents original papers published in the Journal Corrosion & Materials.

Engineering organizations